

Events
New York police lieutenant "Big Bill" William S. Devery is dismissed from the New York police force as head of the 11th Ward vice districts after the Lexow Investigation Committee find evidence of corruption and graft. Much of the evidence obtained by committee is from Rev. Charles H. Parkhurst, leader of the New York Society for the Prevention of Crime, revealing the extent of Tammany Hall's influence within the NYPD. Other officials charged with corruption and graft would include Alexander "Clubber" Williams. 
The On Leong Merchant Association, a Tong organization, is formed in Boston, Massachusetts.

Arts and literature

Births
David Beck, Teamster's Union President
Willie Moretti, Abner Zwillman enforcer and New Jersey Prohibition gangster 
Jacob Orgen, New York gangster and labor union racketeer

Deaths

References 

Years in organized crime
Organized crime